In the 1962–63 season, MC Alger is competing in the Criteria of Honour for the 1st season, as well as the Algerian Cup. They will be competing in National, and the Algerian Cup.

Squad list
Players and squad numbers last updated on 18 November 1976.Note: Flags indicate national team as has been defined under FIFA eligibility rules. Players may hold more than one non-FIFA nationality.

Pre-season and friendlies

Competitions

Overview

Championnat National

League table

Results by round

Matches

Final Groups

Algiers

P = Matches played; W = Matches won; D = Matches drawn; L = Matches lost; F = Goals for; A = Goals against; GD = Goal difference; Pts = Points

Final tournament

Algerian Cup

Squad information

Appearances and goals

Goalscorers
Includes all competitive matches. The list is sorted alphabetically by surname when total goals are equal.

Notes

References

External links
 1962–63 MC Alger season at sebbar.kazeo.com 

MC Alger seasons
Algerian football clubs 1962–63 season